The 2017–18 season was Ayr United’s 108th season of competitive football and their first season back in League One following their relegation from the Championship in the 2016–17 season. Ayr also competed in the League Cup, Scottish Cup and the Challenge Cup.

Summary

Season
In their first season back in the third–tier of Scottish football, Ayr United finished in first place and were promoted as Champions back to the Scottish Championship after only one season in League One.

Results and fixtures

Scottish League One

Scottish League Cup

Group stage

Knockout round

Scottish Challenge Cup

Scottish Cup

Squad statistics

Appearances

|}

Team statistics

League table

Division summary

League Cup Table

Transfers

Players in

Players out

References 

Ayr United F.C. seasons
Ayr